Madhu Warrier (born 5 July 1976), professionally credited as Madhu Wariar, is an Indian actor, director and producer known for his roles in Malayalam films. He produced the films Swa Le (2009) and Mayamohini (2012). His younger sister is actress Manju Warrier.  He directed film Lalitham Sundaram in 2021 which was later released in 2022.

Family and early life
Madhu 's father Madhava Warrier was an accountant and mother Girija Warrier, a housewife. He was born on 5 July 1976 in Nagercoil, Tamil Nadu. His family is originally from Pullu in Thrissur district.  He is an alumnus of Sainik School, Kazhakootam and SN Vidya Mandir, Kannur and he graduated from IHM, Chennai. He worked in The Leela, Mumbai and Disney Cruise Lines before joining the film industry. He married Anu Warrier in 2006 and they have a daughter.

Career
Warrier made his acting debut with a lead role in the Malayalam film The Campus.  He has acted in over 20 movies.  He is also involved in the film industry as a producer. He along with debuting filmmaker P.Sukumar has a production house called Color Factory. He has produced 2 movies, Swa Le and Mayamohini. He did his directorial debut by directing his first film Lalitham Sundaram.

Filmography
2004
 Wanted Playing As Unni

2005
 The Campus..... Rajiv Menon 
 Nerariyan CBI  Playing As Pradeep 
 Bharathchandran I.P.S.  Playing As Anwar 
 Immini Nalloraal  Playing As Rahul 
 Iruvattam Manavaatti Playing As Hareendran 
 Ponmudipuzhayorathu Playing As Kumaran

2006
 Ravanan  Playing As Rajeev Ariyar
 Parayam  Playing As Arjun Menon

2007
 Romeo  Playing As Manuel 
 Hallo  Playing As Susheel Bhai 
 Pranayakalam  Playing As Anand
 The Speed Track  Playing As Rahul 
 Detective  Playing As Basheer
 Anchil Oral Arjunan  Playing As Vinayan

2008
 Twenty:20
 Kerala Police
 Kanal Kannaadi
 Chandranilekkulla Vazhi
 SMS
 Crazy Gopalan
 Veruthe Oru Bharya

2009
 Swa Le (actor, producer)  Playing As Dr. Ramkumar 
 Malayali  Playing AsRameshan 
 Patham Adhyayam  Playing As Niyas

2011
 Kana Kombathu

2012
 Mayamohini (actor, producer) Acting as Anwar IPS

2022
 Lalitham Sundaram (actor, director)

References

External links

Madhu Warrier at MSI

Male actors from Thrissur
Male actors in Malayalam cinema
Indian male film actors
Living people
21st-century Indian male actors
1977 births